The Liberation Army of Preševo, Medveđa and Bujanovac (UÇPMB) was an Albanian militant insurgent group fighting for separation from the Federal Republic of Yugoslavia for three municipalities: Preševo, Medveđa, and Bujanovac, home to most of the Albanians in south Serbia, adjacent to Kosovo. Of the three municipalities, two have an ethnic Albanian majority, whilst Medveđa has a significant minority of them.

The UÇPMB's uniforms, procedures and tactics mirrored those of the then freshly disbanded Kosovo Liberation Army (KLA). The 1,500-strong paramilitary launched the insurgency in the Preševo Valley from 1999 to 2001, with the goal of joining these municipalities to Kosovo. The EU condemned what it described as the "extremism" and use of "illegal terrorist actions" by the group.

History
After the end of the Kosovo War in 1999, a three-mile "Ground Safety Zone" (GSZ) was established between Kosovo (governed by the UN) and inner Serbia and Montenegro. Yugoslav Forces (VJ) units were not permitted there, and only the lightly armed Serbian Ministry of Internal Affairs forces were left in the area.

The exclusion zone included the predominantly Albanian village of Dobrosin, but not Preševo. Serbian police had to stop patrolling the area to avoid being ambushed. Ethnic Albanian politicians opposed to the KLA were attacked, including Zemail Mustafi (the vice-president of the Bujanovac branch of Slobodan Milošević's Socialist Party of Serbia) who was assassinated.

Between 21 June 1999 and 12 November 2000, 294 attacks were recorded, most of them (246) in Bujanovac, 44 in Medveđa and six in Preševo. These attacks resulted in 14 people killed (of which six were civilians and eight were policemen), 37 people wounded (two UN observers, three civilians and 34 policemen) and five civilians kidnapped. In their attacks, UÇPMB used mostly assault rifles, machine guns, mortars and sniper rifles, but occasionally also RPGs, hand grenades, and anti-tank and anti-personnel mines.

The UÇPMB included minors.

As the situation escalated, NATO allowed the VJ to reclaim the demilitarized zone on 24 May 2001, at the same time giving the UÇPMB the opportunity to turn themselves over to the Kosovo Force (KFOR), which promised to only take their weapons and note their names before releasing them. More than 450 UÇPMB members took advantage of KFOR's "screen and release" policy, among them commander Shefket Musliu, who turned himself over to KFOR at a checkpoint along the GSZ just after midnight of 26 May 2001.

Aftermath

The former KLA next moved to western Macedonia where they established the National Liberation Army, which fought against the Macedonian government in 2001.

Ali Ahmeti organized the NLA of former KLA and UÇPMB fighters from Kosovo and Macedonia, Albanian insurgents from Preševo, Medveđa and Bujanovac in Serbia, young Albanian nationalists from Macedonia, and foreign fighters.

Notable people
Shefket Musliu (highest commander)
Muhamet Xhemajli (second commander)
Ridvan Qazimi "Lleshi" (third commander)
Njazi Azemi "Mjekrra" (commander)
Pacir Shicri (spokesman)
Tahir Dalipi (spokesman)
Jonuz Musliu
Shaqir Shaqiri
Mustafa Shaqiri
Nagip Ali
Orhan Rexhepi
Lirim Jukupi
Arben Ramadani

Notes

References

External links
In Serbia, Albanian gunmen go silently to work, The Independent, 2 March 2000.
A War Waiting to Happen: Clashes between Serbs and ethnic Albanians in southern Serbia threaten to ignite a fresh conflict, TIME, 13 March 2000.
Albanian rebels training for Serbian war, BBC News, 12 February 2001
Albanian separatists continue fighting in Kosovo buffer zone, World Socialist Web Site, 14 February 2001.

Kosovo Liberation Army
Albanian militant groups
Albanian nationalism in Serbia
Albanian separatism
Paramilitary organizations based in Yugoslavia
Paramilitary organizations in the Yugoslav Wars
Separatism in Serbia
Secessionist organizations in Europe
Terrorism in Serbia
Organizations established in 1999
Organizations disestablished in 2001
Albanians in Serbia
1999 establishments in Yugoslavia